Richard Hirschbäck (2 July 1937 – 13 July 2007) was an Austrian painter. He was a founding member of the Austrian artist group Gruppe 77.

Life and work
Hirschbäck was born on 2 July 1937 in Schwarzach St. Veit.
He was a member of the Austrian artist group  until 1977; in that year he was among the twenty-nine founding members of the Gruppe 77 artist group.

He left thousands of works: drawings in ink and in pencil, paintings in water colours, in tempera and in oils, and mixed media works.

In 1972, Hirschbäck received the art prize of the town of Köflach, followed by a retrospective in the Neue Galerie der Stadt Linz, now the Lentos Museum in Linz.

His work is in the collections of the Albertina and the Österreichische Galerie Belvedere in Vienna, and the Lentos Art Museum in Linz.

References

Further reading

 Grimmer, Dietgard. Richard Hirschbäck, In Zusammenarbeit mit der Galerie im TRAKLHAUS, Salzburg, 1992
 RAURIS 1981, TRAKLHAUS, Arge-Alp-Symposium + Malertage, Salzburg, 1981
 Gerhard Haberl, Horst. Richard Hirschbäck, Publikation in Zusammenarbeit mit der Galerie H, Graz, anläßlich der Ausstellungen in der Galerie AM RABENSTEIG, Wien und im TRAKLHAUS, Salzburg, 1975
 Hirschbäck, Exhibition catalogue, Künstlerhaus, Salzburg, 1981
 Grimmer, Dietgard. Querschnitt, Traklhaus, Salzburg, 1992
 Künstlergruppe 77, Graz, Künstlergruppe 77, Graz, 1991	
 Neuhold, Alois. Hommage a Gerhard Lojen, Minoriten Galerien Graz, Künstlergruppe 77, Graz, 2007
 Ungeduldiges Papier, Ausstellung der Künstlergruppe 77 Graz in der Wiener Sezession, Oktober 1984

External links
 

2007 deaths
1937 births
Austrian artists
Academy of Fine Arts Vienna alumni